The Fort McMurray Giants are a collegiate summer baseball team based in Fort McMurray operating out of Legacy Dodge Field in Fort McMurray, Alberta, Canada. They play in the Western Canadian Baseball League. The team was formed in 2016 as an expansion team and began playing at the Edmonton Ballpark at the beginning of their inaugural season, due to the wildfire and evacuation of their hometown.

References

Amateur baseball teams in Canada
Baseball teams in Alberta
Baseball teams established in 2016
Fort McMurray
2016 establishments in Alberta